The teams competing in Group 3 of the 2013 UEFA European Under-21 Championship qualifying competition were Andorra, Armenia, Czech Republic, Montenegro, and Wales.

Standings

Results and fixtures

Goalscorers
9 goals
 Jan Chramosta

4 goals

 Václav Kadlec
 Stefan Nikolić

3 goals

 Edgar Malakyan
 Stefan Mugoša

2 goals

 Hovhannes Hovhannisyan
 Valter Poghosyan
 Vladimír Darida
 Stanislav Tecl
 Tomáš Wágner
 Asmir Kajević
 Billy Bodin

1 goal

 Luigi San Nicolas
 Adam Smith
 Hovhannes Hambardzumyan
 Kamo Hovhannisyan
 Taron Voskanyan
 Artak Yedigaryan
 Josef Hušbauer
 Milan Nitrianský
 Filip Novák
 Jakub Petr
 Ondřej Vaněk
 Ermin Alić
 Radivoje Golubović
 Miloš Radulović
 Marko Vešović
 Marko Vukčević
 Daniel Alfei
 Ryan Doble
 Thomas Bradshaw

1 own goal

 Armand Fajardo (playing against Wales)
 Xavier Vieira (playing against Wales)

References

External links
Standings and fixtures at UEFA.com

Group 3